Operation Al Majid (Arabic: عملية الماجد) was an operation conducted by both Marines and Iraqi security forces intended to disrupt and defeat insurgent activity throughout more than  in western Al Anbar Province. The operation began in the fall of 2006 and resulted in a series of berms being constructed around the cities of Anah, Haditha, Haqlaniyah, and Barwanah.

References

 Gains in stability slow but tangible in Haditha
 Unit sees efforts stabilize city, drive back insurgents
 Additional Coalition forces, construction of dirt ‘berms’ increase security conditions in Iraq’s Haditha Triad region
 U.S. Army unit rescues kidnapped Iraqis from insurgents
 

Military operations of the Iraq War involving the United States
Military operations of the Iraq War in 2006
United States Marine Corps in the Iraq War